Hawkhead railway station is a railway station in the Seedhill area of Paisley, Renfrewshire, Scotland.

History 
The station opened on 1 May 1894 and was closed on 1 January 1917. It was reopened in 1919 and was closed to passengers on 14 February 1966.

A newly built station opened on 12 April 1991 following the resumption of train services on the Paisley Canal Line, in 1990 by British Rail.

Services 

On Sundays, an hourly service operates to both Paisley Canal and Glasgow Central,

References

Notes

Sources 
 
 
 

Railway stations in Renfrewshire
Railway stations in Great Britain opened in 1894
Railway stations in Great Britain closed in 1917
Railway stations in Great Britain opened in 1919
Railway stations in Great Britain closed in 1966
Railway stations in Great Britain opened in 1991
Reopened railway stations in Great Britain
Railway stations served by ScotRail
Former Glasgow and South Western Railway stations
Beeching closures in Scotland
SPT railway stations
Transport in Paisley, Renfrewshire
1894 establishments in Scotland
Buildings and structures in Paisley, Renfrewshire
1919 establishments in Scotland
1991 establishments in Scotland
1917 disestablishments in Scotland
1966 disestablishments in Scotland